The Northern Ohio League (NOL) was an OHSAA athletic league in north central Ohio that began competition in 1944 and disbanded in 2017 after six of its seven members joined the Sandusky Bay Conference.

All-time members

League History

1940s
The NOL was formed in 1944 as the third-oldest high school league in Ohio. The original members were Bellevue, Bucyrus, Crestline, Galion, Norwalk, Shelby, Upper Sandusky and Willard.

1950s
In 1954, Crestline left and was replaced by Tiffin Columbian.

2000s
In what was accepted as a move based on competing with schools closer to their size, Bucyrus left after the 2001-02 school year for the North Central Conference and was replaced by Fostoria during winter of the 2002-03 school year.  Fostoria had considered joining the NOL back in 1961.
In February and March 2009, Upper Sandusky and Galion were accepted as the ninth and tenth members of the North Central Conference, beginning in fall 2011.  Both schools had cited long travel for NOL games as partial factors. Meanwhile, Fostoria applied for membership in the Suburban Lakes League, but was initially turned down.
In June 2009, the member schools of the NOL voted to accept Sandusky into the league, with competition beginning in 2011.
On August 17, 2009, Fostoria voted to join the newly formed Northern Buckeye Conference in 2011 with Rossford, coming from the Northern Lakes League and Eastwood, Elmwood, Genoa, Lake, Otsego and Woodmore, all schools that are coming from the Suburban Lakes League.
Clear Fork (Ohio Cardinal Conference) and Vermilion (West Shore Conference) are brought up as potential candidates to bring the league's membership back to 8 schools.

2010s
After a proposal to merge with the Sandusky Bay Conference was turned down by SBC principals, the NOL sought out additional  members for their league.
Vermilion was initially admitted as a future member in 2011, to join in all sports but football for 2012-13, and for football in 2013-14.  However, at a board meeting on June 11, 2012, they decided to recommit to the West Shore Conference and not leave for the NOL in 2012.
Ontario was admitted as a member of the NOL for the 2013-14 school year. This happened a year before the North Central Conference folded in 2014.  Galion was also invited to re-join the league, but they ultimately decided to join the MOAC after citing concern over potential league trips to Vermilion.
According to the Willard Times-Junction, letters were sent to schools to consider NOL membership:  former NOL members Upper Sandusky and Galion; Clyde, Edison, and Huron of the Sandusky Bay Conference; Clear Fork of the Ohio Cardinal Conference; and Western Reserve of the Firelands Conference.
Because of their shrinking enrollment, it had been rumored that Willard considered options outside of the NOL, including the newly formed Northern 10 Athletic Conference.
On March 8, 2016, Ontario announced that they would join the Mid-Ohio Athletic Conference in the 2017-18 school year as they were not invited to join the SBC.  Eight days later, it was announced by Clyde High School principal William J. Webb that the remaining six NOL schools would join the Sandusky Bay Conference for the 2017-18 school year, ending the NOL after 73 years of competition.

Championships

Boys Championships
All league champions have been updated besides champions from Crestline, Fostoria and Galion.

Girls Championships
All league champions have been updated besides champions from Fostoria and Galion.

See also
 Ohio High School Athletic Conferences

References

External links
List of NOL Football Champions
List of NOL Boys Basketball Champions
All-Time Boys Basketball Standings

Ohio high school sports conferences